Airopsis is a genus of southern European and northern African plants in the grass family.

Species
The only accepted species is Airopsis tenella, native to the western Mediterranean: Portugal, Spain, France incl Corsica, Italy incl Sicily, Algeria, Tunisia, Morocco.

formerly included
Numerous other species were once included in Airopsis but are now regarded as better suited to other genera, including Aira Antinoria Dissanthelium Eragrostis Pentameris Periballia Poa Sphenopholis

See also 
 List of Poaceae genera

References 

Pooideae
Monotypic Poaceae genera
Taxa named by Antonio José Cavanilles